Guyasuta  (c. 1725–c. 1794; , either "he stands up to the cross" or "he sets up the cross") was an important Native American leader of the Seneca people in the second half of the eighteenth century, playing a central role in the diplomacy and warfare of that era. At young age, he and his family migrated along the Allegheny River and finally settled in Logstown, an Iroquois village in Pennsylvania. The paternal half of his ancestry were decorated warriors.

Biography 

Guyasuta made acquaintance with young George Washington (whom he called "Tall Hunter") in 1753 when he accompanied and guided him through Pennsylvania to the French Fort Le Boeuf, and is referred to as "The Hunter" in Washington's personal journals. Despite the expedition, Guyasuta played a role in defeating the Braddock Expedition in 1755, and allied with the French in the French and Indian War. Guyasuta was a major player in Pontiac's Rebellion—indeed, some historians once referred to that war as the Pontiac-Guyasuta War.

At the outset of the American Revolutionary War, the American revolutionaries attempted to win Guyasuta to their cause but, like most Iroquois, he sided with the British because they seemed willing to cooperate, and took part in the Battle of Oriskany. After the war, the aging Guyasuta worked to establish peaceful relations with the new United States as his nephew, Cornplanter, became a more diplomatic figure. As he saw his dream of a peaceful and strong Native American nation crumble, he turned to alcohol. He died in his Pennsylvania cabin in 1794, and was buried nearby with his tomahawk, shotgun, knife, trophies and various other personal items in his coffin.

Guyasuta was a maternal uncle to Cornplanter and Handsome Lake.

Although never baptized, Guyasuta was given a Christian burial and according to one account, may be buried at Custaloga Town Scout Reservation, now a Boy Scout camp located along French Creek at the former site of Chief Custaloga's village in French Creek Township, Pennsylvania.

Legacy 
In Pittsburgh, he is honored, along with George Washington, in a large public sculpture called Point of View, which overlooks Point State Park. Also the Laurel Highlands Council of the Boy Scouts of America has a camp property named in his honor.  A statue of Guyasuta stands at the intersection of Main and North Canal Streets in Sharpsburg, Pennsylvania.

The Kinzua Reservoir, the artificial lake created by the damming of the Allegheny River, has a beach and camping park named "Kiasutha Recreation Area," named in his honor.

References

Further reading

  Western Pennsylvania History article on the Guyasuta Boy Scout estate.

1720s births
1790s deaths
History of Pittsburgh
Native Americans in the American Revolution
Native American leaders
Native American people of the Indian Wars
People of colonial Pennsylvania
Indigenous people of Pontiac's War
Indigenous people of the French and Indian War
Seneca people
Burials in Pennsylvania
Native American people from Pennsylvania